Stigmella fibigeri is a moth of the family Nepticulidae. It was described by Puplesis and Diškus in 2003.

References

Nepticulidae
Moths described in 2003
Endemic fauna of Nepal
Moths of Asia